Ibalia anceps is a species of ibaliid wasp in the family Ibaliidae. It is found in North America.

References

Parasitic wasps
Articles created by Qbugbot
Insects described in 1824
Cynipoidea